Watters Smith Memorial State Park is a  historical park and national historic district with a pioneer homestead and museum located in Harrison County, West Virginia. The homestead, rising above Duck Creek,  is a memorial to settler Watters Smith, who was born in Trenton, New Jersey, in 1767, and moved to Harrison County in what was then Virginia, in 1796, with his wife Elizabeth Davisson Smith.   A log cabin similar to the original was moved and reconstructed on the park, together with farm buildings typical of early 19th century settlement. The more modern Smith family home (c. 1876) has been restored as a museum, and an additional museum houses many local farm artifacts from earlier eras. Guided tours are offered from Memorial Day weekend through Labor Day. In addition, the park features swimming, picnicking, hiking trails, and horseback riding.

It was listed on the National Register of Historic Places in 1974 as the Watters Smith Farm on Duck Creek.

Mountain biking
Watters Smith Park has become a local hot spot for mountain biking. The park boasts a bike wash and maintenance area and over 12 miles of single track riding including numerous technical sections and elevation gains. With up-to-date maps and well marked trails, the park offers trails for every skill level from beginner to expert.

See also

List of West Virginia state parks
State park
Open-air museum

References

External links

 

Parks on the National Register of Historic Places in West Virginia
History of West Virginia
State parks of West Virginia
Protected areas of Harrison County, West Virginia
Farm museums in the United States
Protected areas established in 1949
History museums in West Virginia
Museums in Harrison County, West Virginia
Farms on the National Register of Historic Places in West Virginia
National Register of Historic Places in Harrison County, West Virginia
Historic districts in Harrison County, West Virginia
IUCN Category III
1949 establishments in West Virginia